I Putu Gede Juni Antara (born 7 June 1995), simply known as Putu Gede, is an Indonesian professional footballer who plays as a right-back for Bhayangkara. He is also a Second Police Brigadier in the Indonesian National Police.

Club career

Persebaya ISL 
On 11 November 2014, Putu Gede signed a four-year contract with Persebaya ISL. He made his debut on 5 April 2015 as starting line-up, which ended 1–0 victory against Mitra Kukar at Gelora Bung Tomo Stadium.

Personal life 
Putu Gede Juni Antara is the only son of Balinese parents and is a practicing Hindu. He is considered very sociable and friendly by his teammates with multiple social media accounts.

International career 
He made his international debut for senior team on 21 March 2017, against Myanmar.

Career statistics

Club

International

Honours

Club
Bhayangkara
 Liga 1: 2017

International
Indonesia U-17
 HKFA International Youth Invitation: 2012
Indonesia U-19
 HKFA International Youth Invitation: 2013
 AFF U-19 Youth Championship: 2013
Indonesia U-23
 Southeast Asian Games  Bronze medal: 2017
Indonesia
 Aceh World Solidarity Cup runner-up: 2017

References

External links 
 
 

Indonesian footballers
1995 births
Living people
Balinese people
Indonesian Hindus
Indonesia youth international footballers
Indonesia international footballers
Liga 1 (Indonesia) players
Bhayangkara F.C. players
People from Gianyar Regency
Sportspeople from Bali
Association football fullbacks
Southeast Asian Games bronze medalists for Indonesia
Southeast Asian Games medalists in football
Footballers at the 2018 Asian Games
Competitors at the 2017 Southeast Asian Games
Asian Games competitors for Indonesia